Palau-de-Cerdagne is a commune in the eastern Pyrenees (Pyrénées-Orientales department in southern France).

The people of the town celebrate the Xicolatada, every year, on the 16th of August.

Geography 
Palau-de-Cerdagne is located in the canton of Les Pyrénées catalanes and in the arrondissement of Prades.

Population

See also
Communes of the Pyrénées-Orientales department

References

Communes of Pyrénées-Orientales